Xavier Lacroix (22 September 1947 – 29 June 2021) was a French philosopher and theologian.

He was a professor of philosophy and moral theology at the Catholic University of Lyon.

References

1947 births
2021 deaths
French philosophers
21st-century French Catholic theologians
Academic staff of the Catholic University of Lyon